Martha is a feminine given name (Latin from Ancient Greek Μάρθα (Mártha), from Aramaic מרתא (Mārtā) "the mistress" or "the lady", from מרה "mistress", feminine of מרי "master").

Variants in different languages:
 Maata (Maori)
 Марфа (Marfa) (Russian and Belarusian), formerly spelled "Марѳа" from the Greek version of the name, that the Russians assimilate in F
 Márta (Hungarian)
 Marta (Bulgarian, Catalan, Croatian, Czech, Danish, Italian, Latvian, Macedonian, Norwegian, Polish, Portuguese, Romanian, Serbian, Slovak, Slovene, Spanish, Swedish)
 Марта (Marta) (Ukrainian)
 Marthe (French, German, Dutch)
 Martta (Finnish)
 Mártuska (Hungarian)
 Moireach (Scottish Gaelic)
 Morta (Lithuanian)

People with the name
 Martha, biblical figure
 Martha, mother of Simeon Stylites the Younger (died 551), saint of the Eastern Orthodox Church
 Marthã (born 1997), Brazilian football player, full name Marthã Fernando Gonçalves Pimenta
 Martha Ackmann (born 1951), American author and journalist
 Martha Angelici (1907–1973), French operatic soprano
 Martha Ankomah (born 1986), Ghanaian actress
 Martha Araújo (born 1943), Brazilian sculpture and performance artist
 Martha Argerich (born 1941), Argentine pianist
 Martha Violet Ball (1811–1894), American educator, philanthropist, activist, writer, and editor
 Martha E. Cram Bates (1839–1905), American writer, journalist, and newspaper editor 
 Martha Beck (born 1962), American sociologist
 Martha Warren Beckwith (1871–1959), American folklorist
 Martha Bernays (1861–1951), wife of Sigmund Freud
 Martha A. Boughton (1857–1928), American author, educator, and poet
 Martha Brockenbrough, American author
 Martha Burkhardt (1874–1956), Swiss painter
 Martha Burns (born 1957), Canadian actress 
 Martha Haines Butt (1833–1871), American author and suffragist
 Martha Coakley (born 1953), former Attorney General of Massachusetts
 Martha Collison (born 1996), British baker and food columnist
 Martha Coolidge (born 1946), American film and television director
 Martha Parke Custis (1756–1773), daughter of Martha Washington
 Martha Foster Crawford (1830–1909), American writer, missionary 
 Martha E. Sewall Curtis (1858–1915), American suffragist, writer
 Martha Davis (1917–1960), American singer and pianist
 Martha Davis (born 1951), American new wave singer-songwriter
 Martha Derthick (1933–2015), American political scientist
 Martha Dewing Woodward (1856–1950), artist
 Martha Diaz (born 1969), Colombian-American community organizer
 Martha De Laurentiis (1954–2021), American film producer
 Martha de la Torre, American journalist
 Martha deMey Clow (1932–2010), American writer of science fiction
 Martha Dodd (1908–1990), American journalist and novelist
 Martha Dodray, Indian health worker
 Martha Fiennes (born 1964), English film director, writer and producer
 Martha Hall Findlay (born 1959), Canadian politician
 Martha Finley (1828–1909), American teacher, author
 Martha Firestone Ford (born 1925), American businesswoman
 Martha Gellhorn (1908–1998), American journalist, novelist, and travel writer
 Martha Graham (1894–1991), American dancer and choreographer
 Martha Grimes (born 1931), American writer of detective fiction
 Martha Hart (born 1966), Canadian charity benefactor
 Martha S. Hearron (1943–2014), American statistician
 Martha Higareda (born 1983), Mexican actress
 Martha High (born 1945), American female vocalist
 Martha Howe-Douglas, English actress and writer
 Martha Hunt (born 1989), American fashion model
 Martha Rivers Ingram (born 1935), American business executive and philanthropist
 Martha Issová (born 1981), Czech film, television and stage actress
 Martha Waldron Janes (1832–?), American minister, suffragist, columnist
 Martha Jefferson (1748–1782), wife of Thomas Jefferson, third president of the United States
 Martha Kantor (1896–1981), American glass painter
 Martha Kwataine, Malawian health and human rights activist
  Martha Manning Laurens (1757–1781), wife of John Laurens
 Martha Laurens Ramsay (1759–1811), American memoirist and sister of John Laurens
 Martha Lauzen, American academic and researcher
 Martha D. Lincoln (1838–?), American author and journalist
 Martha Perry Lowe (1829–1902), American poet, activist
 Martha Luna, Venezuelan fashion designer and stylist
 Martha Madison (born 1977), American actress 
 Martha MacCallum (born 1964), American news anchor 
 Martha MacIsaac (born 1984), Canadian actress 
 Martha Manning (born 1952), American clinical psychologist
 Martha Márquez Alvarado (born 1984), Mexican politician 
 Martha Mears (1910–1986), radio and film contralto singer 
 Martha Mears (author), British midwife and writer 
 Martha Beall Mitchell (1918–1976), wife of John N. Mitchell, United States Attorney General
 Martha Reed Mitchell (1818-1902), American philanthropist and socialite
 Martha Mmola (died 2020), South African politician
 Martha H. Mowry (1818-1899), American physician
 Martha Darley Mutrie (1824–1885), British painter
 Martha Nichols (born 1987), American choreographer and dancer
 Martha Nussbaum (born 1947), American philosopher 
 Martha Capps Oliver (1845–1917), American poet
 Martha Plimpton (born 1970), American actress
 Martha M. Place (1849–1899), American murderer 
 Martha Raddatz (born 1953), American TV reporter  
 Martha Jefferson Randolph (1772–1836), daughter of Thomas Jefferson
 Martha Raye (1916–1994), American comic actress and singer
 Martha Reeves (born 1941), American R&B and pop singer
 Martha Rendell (1871–1909), Australian criminal
 Martha Farnsworth Riche (born 1939), American census director
 Martha Roby (born 1976), American politician 
 Martha Root (1872–1939), teacher of the Bahá'í Faith 
 Martha Parmelee Rose (1834-1923), American journalist, reformer and philanthropist
 Martha Rosler (born 1943), American artist 
 Martha Ross (1939–2019), British actress and radio presenter 
 Martha J. Ross (1923–2013), American oral historian
 Martha Scott (1912–2003), American actress 
 Martha Betz Shapley (1890–1981), American astronomer
 Martha Pearson Smith (1836-?), American poet, musician, temperance activist
 Martha Stewart (born 1941), American businesswoman and television personality
 Martha Stewart (actress) (1922–2021), American singer and actress
 Martha Tabram (1849–1888), English sex worker
 Martha G. Thorwick (1863–1921), Norwegian-born American clubwoman and medical doctor
 Martha Vasconcellos (born 1948), Brazilian beauty queen
 Martha Vaughan (1926–2018), American biochemist
 Martha Vázquez (born 1953), American judge
 Martha Veléz (born 1945), American actress and singer
 Martha Vickers (1925–1971), American model and actress
 Martha Villalobos (born 1962), Mexican professional wrestler
 Martha Wainwright (born 1976), Canadian-American folk-rock singer-songwriter
 Martha Wash (born 1953), American singer-songwriter
 Martha Washington (1731–1802), wife of George Washington, first president of the United States
 Martha E. Whitten (1842–1917), American author
 Martha Loftin Wilson (1834–1919), American missionary worker, journal editor, heroine of the American Civil War
 Martha Wintermute (1842–1918), American author and poet
 Martha Wolfenstein (1869–1906), American novelist
 Saint Martha (Martyr), 3rd-century martyr

Fictional characters
 Martha, the titular character in the animated series Martha Speaks
 Countess Martha Dracula, deceased wife of Count Dracula and late mother of Mavis from the Hotel Transylvania franchise.
Martha Morris-Hunter, a supporting character in The Unicorn Chronicles series.
 Martha Jones, companion of the Tenth Doctor from the BBC series Doctor Who
 Martha Kent, adoptive mother of Clark Kent (Superman) from DC Comics
 Martha Wayne, mother of Bruce Wayne (Batman) from DC Comics
 Martha Behamfil, a survivor in the video game Identity V
 Martha Bessell, a character from Spring Awakening
 Martha Brewster, a main character in the play Arsenic and Old Lace
 Martha Dunnstock, a character from the 1988 film Heathers and it's 2014 musical adaptation
 Martha Nielsen, a main character in the German television series Dark

Feminine given names

fr:Martha
it:Martha
la:Martha
nl:Martha
no:Martha
pt:Martha
fi:Martha
vi:Martha